Manfred "Manni" Seifert (22 April 1949, in Rosenheim – April 2005, in Rosenheim) was a German football player. He spent 4 seasons in the Bundesliga with FC Bayern Munich.

Honours
 Bundesliga champion: 1972, 1973.
 Bundesliga runner-up: 1970, 1971.
 DFB-Pokal winner: 1971.

External links
 

1949 births
2005 deaths
German footballers
FC Bayern Munich footballers
Bundesliga players
Association football goalkeepers
People from Rosenheim
Sportspeople from Upper Bavaria
Footballers from Bavaria